The house at 49 Vinal Avenue in Somerville, Massachusetts is a stylish combination of Colonial Revival and Shingle styling.  The -story wood-frame house was built c. 1894.  It has a wide gambrel roof with cross gables that are also gambreled.  The front cross gable is flanked by two hip roof dormers whose windows are flanked by pilasters and topped by an entablature with wooden garlands and dentil molding. The house is clad in wavy cut shingles, and its windows are topped by tall entablatures.  It has a porch running the width of the front facade that is uncovered except for a portico sheltering the front door.

The house was listed on the National Register of Historic Places in 1989.

See also
House at 42 Vinal Avenue, Somerville, MA
National Register of Historic Places listings in Somerville, Massachusetts

References

Houses on the National Register of Historic Places in Somerville, Massachusetts
Shingle Style houses
Colonial Revival architecture in Massachusetts
Shingle Style architecture in Massachusetts